Blackpool Football Club is an English association football club based in Blackpool, Lancashire, that currently competes in the EFL Championship. The club was founded in 1887 and became founder members of the Lancashire League during the 1889–90 season. The team was elected to The Football League in 1896 and remained there, with the exception of the 1898–99 season where they failed to gain re-election, until the club was promoted to the Premier League in 2010. Blackpool were relegated back to the Football League for the following season where they've remained to the present.

Through the years Blackpool have competed across the top four tiers of the English football pyramid in the First Division, Premier League, Second Division, Championship, Third Division, League One, Fourth Division and League Two. Blackpool's record against each club faced in these competitions is listed below.

The team that Blackpool has met most in league competition is Burnley, against whom they have contested 116 league matches (as of the end of the 2020–21 season). Blackpool have won 38 of their league matches against Leicester City, the most they have won against any club. Blackpool have drawn more matches with Fulham than with any other club; out of the 102 league matches between the two teams, 31 have finished without a winner. Burnley have defeated Blackpool in league competition on 54 occasions, which represents the most Blackpool have lost against any club.

Key
The records include the results of matches played by Blackpool in The Football League (from 1896 to 1899, 1900 to 2010, 2011 to 2021) and the Premier League (from 2010 to 2011). Wartime matches are regarded as unofficial and are excluded, as are matches from the abandoned 1939–40 season. Test Matches, Football League play-offs, cup matches, friendly matches and matches played in the Lancashire League are not included.
For the sake of simplicity, present-day names are used throughout: for example, results against Leicester Fosse, Newton Heath and Woolwich Arsenal are integrated into the records against Leicester City, Manchester United and Arsenal, respectively.
  Teams with this background and symbol in the "Club" column are competing in the 2021–22 EFL Championship alongside Blackpool.
  Clubs with this background and symbol in the "Club" column are now defunct.
P = matches played; W = matches won; D = matches drawn; L = matches lost; F = Goals scored; A = Goals conceded; GD = goal difference of total matches played; Win% = percentage of total matches won

All-time league record
Statistics correct as of matches played on 9 May 2021.

References

General
Books

Websites

League record by Opponent
Blackpool